In its ancient usage, a hypothesis is a summary of the plot of a classical drama. These hypotheses were often copied as a preface to the text of the surviving Athenian tragedies in Medieval manuscripts. They also indicated whether any other tragic poets had dramatised the story, gave its setting, identified the chorus and the character who delivered the prologue, and indicated the date of its first production and the titles of the poet's other plays performed that year, as well as the poet's rivals in the dramatic competition and the prize awarded.

References

Sources
 Easterling, P. E., ed. 1997. The Cambridge Companion to Greek Tragedy. Cambridge Companions to Literature ser. Cambridge: Cambridge UP. .
 Gregory, Justina, ed. 2005. A Companion to Greek Tragedy. Blackwell Companions to the Ancient World ser. Malden, MA and Oxford: Blackwell. .

Ancient Greek theatre
Classical philology
Documents
Greek words and phrases